The 2015–16 Macedonian First League was the 24th season of the Macedonian First Football League, the highest football league of Macedonia. It began on 9 August 2015 and ended on 19 May 2016. It was the last season as the format changed from the 2016–17 season which will each team be played the other sides four times on home-away basis, for a total of 36 matches each instead of play-off and play-out after 27th round.

The league was contested by 10 teams. Vardar are the defending champions, having won their eight title in 2014–15.

Promotion and relegation 

1 Mladost Carev Dvor was declined their participation from the Second League due to financial problems.

Participating teams

Personnel and kits

Note: Flags indicate national team as has been defined under FIFA eligibility rules. Players may hold more than one non-FIFA nationality.

Regular season
The first 27 Rounds comprise the first phase of the season, also called the Regular season. In the first phase, every team plays against each other team twice on a home-away basis till all the teams have played two matches against each other. The table standings at the end of the Regular season determine the group in which each team is going to play in the Play-offs.

League table

Results

Matches 1–18

Matches 19–27

Second phase
The second phase are the so-called Play-off Rounds which is divided in two groups: Championship and Relegation. The top 6 ranked teams on the table after the Regular Season qualify for the Championship group, while the bottom 4 advance to the Relegation group.

Championship round
In the Championship round, each team plays against every other one only once, making 5 games in total. Records from the first phase are carried over. Teams play each other once with each team playing five games in this round.

Table

Results

Relegation round
In the Relegation round, each team plays twice against every opponent on a home-away basis. Records from the first phase are carried over. Teams play each other twice with each team playing six games in this round.

Table

Results

Relegation play-offs

First leg

Second leg

Pelister won 3–1 on aggregate.

Season statistics

Top scorers

Source: MacedonianFootball

See also
2015–16 Macedonian Football Cup
2015–16 Macedonian Second Football League
2015–16 Macedonian Third Football League

References

External links
Football Federation of Macedonia 
MacedonianFootball.com 

Macedonia
1
2014-15